Charles Pillet (July 20, 1869 – 1960) was a French sculptor and engraver.

Born in Paris, Pillet was a pupil of Henri-Michel-Antoine Chapu and Jules-Clément Chaplain. He won the first Grand Prix de Rome engraving medals 1890. He became a member of the Société des Artistes Français in 1898. The Louvre preserves a letter he wrote to Eugène Delacroix.

Honors and awards
Grand Prix de Rome engraving medal in 1890.
Third-class medal in 1895.
Second-class medal in 1896.
Silver medal at the Universal Exhibition of 1900.
First class medal in 1905.
Medal of Honor in 1923.
Knight of the Legion of Honour in 1911.

Bibliography
 Emmanuel Bénézit Dictionary of painters, sculptors, designers and engravers, 1976, Volume 8, p. 336.

External links

References

1869 births
1960 deaths
19th-century engravers
20th-century engravers
French engravers
Prix de Rome for engraving
20th-century French printmakers